The Tri-Cities is the region comprising the cities of Kingsport, Johnson City, and Bristol and the surrounding smaller towns and communities in Northeast Tennessee and Southwest Virginia. All three cities are located in Northeast Tennessee, while Bristol has a twin city of the same name in Virginia.

The Tri-Cities region was formerly a single Metropolitan Statistical Area (MSA); due to the U.S. Census Bureau's revised definitions of urban areas in the early 2000s, it is now a Combined Statistical Area (CSA) with two metropolitan components: Johnson City and Kingsport-Bristol (TN)-Bristol (VA).  However, the Tri-Cities are usually still considered one population center, which is the fifth-largest in Tennessee.

Combined Statistical Area

Components
Tennessee
Carter County
Greene County 
Hancock County
Hawkins County 
Johnson County
Sullivan County
Unicoi County
Washington County

Virginia
City of Bristol (Independent City)
Russell County
Scott County
Washington County

Communities

Places with more than 50,000 inhabitants
Johnson City, Tennessee (principal city)
Kingsport, Tennessee (principal city)

Places with 10,000 to 50,000 inhabitants
Bristol, Tennessee (principal city)
Bristol, Virginia (principal city)
Elizabethton, Tennessee
Greeneville, Tennessee

Places with 1,000 to 10,000 inhabitants

Places with fewer than 1,000 inhabitants 
Baileyton, Tennessee
Bulls Gap, Tennessee
Damascus, Virginia
Embreeville, Tennessee (CDP)
Clinchport, Virginia
Duffield, Virginia
Dungannon, Virginia
Meadowview, Virginia (CDP) 
Mooresburg, Tennessee (CDP)
Nickelsville, Virginia 
Telford, Tennessee (CDP)
Watauga, Tennessee

Unincorporated places

Demographics
As of the census of 2000, there were 480,091 people, 199,218 households, and 138,548 families residing within the CSA. The racial makeup of the CSA was 96.22% White, 2.12% African American, 0.20% Native American, 0.40% Asian, 0.02% Pacific Islander, 0.02% from other races, and 0.74% from two or more races. Hispanic or Latino of any race were 0.92% of the population.

The median income for a household in the CSA was $30,331, and the median income for a family was $37,254. Males had a median income of $29,561 versus $21,014 for females. The per capita income for the CSA was $16,923.

Transportation
Interstate Highways I-26 and I-81 intersect in the region, while I-40, I-77, and I-75 are nearby. Tri-Cities Regional Airport (TRI) has non-stop service to Atlanta, Charlotte, Ft. Lauderdale, Orlando, and St. Petersburg/Clearwater. Airlines include Delta Air Lines, Delta Connection, Allegiant Air and American Eagle Airlines. Additionally, TRI manages an aggressive Air Cargo program, administers Foreign Trade Zone 204, supports and promotes U.S. Customs Port 2027, and provides trade development assistance. The Region has both CSX and Norfolk Southern mainline railway access.

Highways

Interstates

US Highways

Airport

The region is served by the Tri-Cities Regional Airport which has scheduled airline passenger jet service.

Education

Colleges and universities
East Tennessee State University
Emmanuel Christian Seminary
Emory & Henry College
King University
Milligan College
Northeast State Community College
University of Virginia's College at Wise
Virginia Intermont College (Closed May 2014)
Virginia Highlands Community College
Walters State Community College
The Kingsport Higher Education Center is a complex in downtown Kingsport, Tennessee that combines classes from five area colleges and universities, including The University of Tennessee.

All-American City Award
The All-America City Award is given by the National Civic League annually to ten cities in the United States. In 1999, the Tri-Cities were collectively designated as an All-America City by the National Civic League.

The award is the oldest community recognition program in the nation and recognizes communities whose citizens work together to identify and tackle community-wide challenges and achieve uncommon results.

Since the program's inception in 1949, more than 4,000 communities have competed and over 500 have been named All-America Cities.

Sister cities

 Guaranda, Ecuador
 Teterow, Germany
 Rybinsk, Russia

See also
Doe River
Watauga River
Watauga Lake
South Holston Lake and River
Nolichucky River
Roan Mountain
Bays Mountain
Gray Fossil Site
Bristol Motor Speedway
Birthplace of Country Music

References
General

Specific
   OMB Bulletin No. 04-03. Updates to Statistical Areas. December 2003.
U.S. Census Bureau, Table 6. Population in Combined Statistical Areas (CSAs): 1990 and 2000

External links
Tri-Cities TN/VA - The Regional Alliance for Economic Development
Northeast Tennessee Tourism Association 

East Tennessee

Geography of Carter County, Tennessee
Geography of Hawkins County, Tennessee
Geography of Unicoi County, Tennessee
Geography of Sullivan County, Tennessee
Geography of Washington County, Tennessee
Geography of Scott County, Virginia
Geography of Washington County, Virginia
Bristol, Virginia